William Henry Mangham Trueman (born 14 October 2002) is an English professional footballer who plays as a central midfielder for Mickleover on loan from Sheffield Wednesday.

Career

Sheffield Wednesday
On the 26 April, Trueman would win the Championship Apprentice of the Year, joining the likes of Jude Bellingham, Ryan Sessegnon and Ademola Lookman, as well as ex Owl Mark Beevers in winning the award. Trueman then signed his first professional contract with the club on 21 June 2021. He had a professional debut to remember in the EFL Trophy against Leicester City U21 on 18 October 2022, starting and scoring his maiden goal in the game.

Loans
On 9 December 2022, Trueman joined Mickloeover on a one-month loan deal.

Career statistics

References

2002 births
Living people
English footballers
Sheffield Wednesday F.C. players